Damerdash Mosque is a historical mosque originally built during the Abbasid era, in Cairo, Egypt. It is located near Damerdash Hospital which belongs to the Ain Shams University Faculty of Medicine.

Architecture
The mosque today consists of a square room with an area of 11 x 10 meters. In the middle of the mosque there are three large muqarnases, and directly above them it has a large oval dome with sixteen small openings, eight of which are open as windows and the other eight are blocked as an ornament. The qibla wall contains a large mihrab on the left side of it, which is a compartment made of wood, and then there is mausoleum of Sheikh al-Demerdash nearby. The mihrab is topped with a window filled with wood ornament, and on each side of the four dome there is also a small square window filled with wood ornament. The present description of the dome is entirely consistent with the description the architect Mubarak mentioned in his plans, indicating that the dome is ancient and dates back to the 12th-century at least, although it has been renewed. The rest of the mosque has been rebuilt because it is very different from the description of Mubarak, as it surrounds the dome now from the south and west sides, has a wooden roof, not exposed and has a niche and a platform in the wall separating it from the dome. The building is surrounded by a garden and a residence belongs to the staff of the mosque. The main entrance to the mosque is located in the south-west and is topped with a Mamluk style minaret.

See also

  Lists of mosques 
  List of mosques in Africa
  List of mosques in Egypt

External links

 Government Website of Islamic artifacts

12th-century mosques
Mosques completed in 1523
Mamluk architecture in Egypt
Mosque buildings with domes
12th-century establishments in the Ayyubid Sultanate
Mosques in Cairo